Con Ouzounidis (Greek: Κων Ουζουνίδης) (born 8 October 1999) is an Australian soccer player who plays as a defender for Esbjerg. 

Ouzounidis was born in Sydney and played youth football with Sutherland Sharks and Everton before making his professional debut with Esbjerg.

Career
As a youth player, Ouzounidis joined the youth academy of English Premier League side Everton. In 2021, he signed for Esbjerg in Denmark.

References

External links
  

1999 births
Association football defenders
Australia youth international soccer players
Australian expatriate soccer players
Australian expatriate sportspeople in Denmark
Australian expatriate sportspeople in England
Australian people of Greek descent
Australian soccer players
Danish 1st Division players
Esbjerg fB players
Expatriate men's footballers in Denmark
Expatriate footballers in England

Living people